Christopher Young (born April 28, 1957) is an American composer and orchestrator of film and television scores.

Many of his compositions are for horror and thriller films, including Hellraiser, Species, Urban Legend, The Grudge, The Exorcism of Emily Rose, Drag Me to Hell, Sinister,  Deliver Us from Evil and Pet Sematary. Other works include Rapid Fire, Copycat, Set It Off, Entrapment, The Hurricane, Swordfish, Ghost Rider,  Spider-Man 3 and The Shipping News, for which he was nominated for a Golden Globe Award for Best Original Score.

Young was honored with the prestigious Richard Kirk award at the 2008 BMI Film and TV Awards. The award is given annually to a composer who has made significant contributions to film and television music.

Life and career
Young was born in Red Bank, New Jersey. He graduated from Hampshire College in Massachusetts with a Bachelor of Arts in music, and then completed his post-graduate work at the University of North Texas. In 1980, he moved to Los Angeles. Originally a jazz drummer, when he heard some of Bernard Herrmann's works he decided to become a film composer. He studied at the UCLA Film School under David Raksin. He teaches at the Thornton School of Music of the University of Southern California.

Discography

Film

1960s

1980s

1990s

2000s

2010s

2020s

Television

Video Games

References

External links

 
 
 Interview with Christopher Young at FilmMusicSite

1957 births
American film score composers
American male film score composers
American television composers
Hampshire College alumni
Living people
People from Red Bank, New Jersey
University of North Texas College of Music alumni
UCLA Film School alumni
USC Thornton School of Music faculty
Musicians from New Jersey
Varèse Sarabande Records artists
La-La Land Records artists